The Trumpet Artistry of Chet Baker is an album by jazz trumpeter Chet Baker recorded in 1953 and 1954 and released on the Pacific Jazz label. The album compiles tracks previously released on the 1954 10 inch LP Chet Baker Sextet along with previously unissued recordings.

Reception

Allmusic rated the album with 3 stars stating "This well-rounded LP features the very popular trumpeter in his early days... those listeners running across this LP will find it a perfect introduction to the music of the early Chet Baker".

Track listing
 "I'm Glad There Is You" (Jimmy Dorsey, Paul Mertz) - 3:10   
 "Moon Love" (Jerome Kern, George Grossmith, Jr., P. G. Wodehouse) - 3:15      
 "Moonlight Becomes You" (Johnny Burke, Jimmy Van Heusen) - 3:24
 "Imagination" (Burke, Van Heusen) - 3:01   
 "Little Man You've Had a Busy Day" (Al Hoffman, Maurice Sigler, Mabel Wayne) - 4:44   
 "Goodbye" (Gordon Jenkins) - 3:50     
 "All the Things You Are" (Jerome Kern, Oscar Hammerstein II) - 2:57   
 "No Ties" (Russ Freeman) - 3:01     
 "Happy Little Sunbeam" (Freeman) - 2:45   
 "Bea's Flat" (Freeman) - 2:58   
 "Russ Job" (Freeman) - 2:54   
 "Tommy Hawk" (Johnny Mandel) - 3:39 
Recorded in Los Angeles on July 29 & 30, 1953 (tracks 4 & 11), at Radio Recorders in Hollywood on October 3, 1953 (tracks 2 & 7-10), at Capitol Studios in Hollywood on December 22, 1953 (tracks 3 & 6) and in Los Angeles on September 9, 1954 (track 12) and September 15, 1954 (tracks 1 & 5)

Personnel
Chet Baker - trumpet
Bob Brookmeyer - valve trombone (tracks 1, 5 & 12)
Herb Geller - alto saxophone, tenor saxophone (tracks 3 & 6)
Jack Montrose - tenor saxophone (tracks 3 & 6)
Bob Gordon (tracks 3 & 6), Bud Shank (tracks 1, 5 & 12) - baritone saxophone
Russ Freeman - piano
Joe Mondragon (tracks 3 & 6), Carson Smith (tracks 1, 5 & 12), Bob Whitlock (tracks 2, 4 & 7-11) - bass
Shelly Manne (tracks 1, 3, 5, 6 & 12), Bobby White (tracks 2, 4 & 7-11) - drums

References 

1955 albums
Chet Baker albums
Pacific Jazz Records albums